The Church of the Immaculate Conception, also known as Adam and Eve's, is a Roman Catholic church run by the Franciscans and it is located on Merchants Quay, Dublin.

History

During the Dissolution reign of King Henry VIII around 1540 the Friary at Francis Street, the site of the current church of St. Nicholas of Myra (Without), Francis Street, was confiscated and the community was dispersed. In 1615 a new friary was built on Cook Street. A chapel on the site was destroyed in 1619 and later rebuilt. The Franciscans secretly said Mass in the Adam and Eve Tavern, where the popular name of the present church comes from. In 1759 a newer church was built, which was later replaced by the current church.

After the Catholic Emancipation in 1829, they set about building a church and laid the foundation stone of the current church in 1834. The original design was by the architect Patrick Byrne who planned a tower on the Merchant's Quay entrance. However due to financial problems the church was built without a nave or tower.

The church was originally dedicated to Saint Francis but in 1889 it was rededicated to the Immaculate Conception of Our Lady.

After 1900, the church was reorganised with the moving of the altar to the left wall and the original sanctuary was changed into a transept and entrance from Cook Street. A small nave was added to the right and a dome built over the sanctuary.

In 1912 a shrine to Saint Anthony was built in 1912 to designs by the architects Doolin, Butler and Donnelly.

In 1926 to celebrate the seventh centenary of Saint Francis, the friars built a circular apse, remodelled the transepts and extended the nave with an entrance to Skippers Alley. The consecration of the high altar took place on 21 September 1928 by Dr. Paschal Robinson, titular Archbishop of Tyana (1870–1948).

Organ
The organ of Adam and Eve's was built by T.W. Magahy in 1936 using pipework from the old Telford organ there. It was rebuilt in 1996 by Trevor Crowe Ldt. There are around 3,000 pipes in the organ, seventy of which are gilded and incorporated in the casework. It is claimed to be the largest pipe organ in a Catholic church in Dublin and is very highly regarded. Eoin Tierney M.A., B.A. (Mus) was the first organ scholar of Adam and Eve’s Church Dublin.

Literary references
Adam and Eve's is mentioned several times in James Joyce's novel Ulysses:

It is also briefly mentioned in "The Dead" from Dubliners:
"Miss Julia, though she was quite gray, was still the leading soprano in Adam and Eve's..."

And the church's site by the River Liffey gave the famous opening lines of Finnegans Wake (1939): riverrun, past Eve and Adam’s, from swerve of shore to bend of bay, brings us by a commodius vicus of recirculation back to Howth Castle and Environs.

References

External links
Irish Franciscans Dublin

Churches of the Roman Catholic Archdiocese of Dublin
Roman Catholic churches in Dublin (city)
Neoclassical church buildings in Ireland